Eucamptognathus spectabilis is a species of ground beetle in the subfamily Pterostichinae. It was described by Castelnau in 1835.

References

Eucamptognathus
Beetles described in 1835